Thorsby is a town in central Alberta, Canada.

Demographics 

In the 2016 Census of Population conducted by Statistics Canada, the Town of Thorsby recorded a population of 985 living in 394 of its 428 total private dwellings, a  change from its 2011 population of 951.

Economy 
The Town of Thorsby is a member of the Leduc-Nisku Economic Development Association, an economic development partnership that markets Alberta's International Region in proximity to the Edmonton International Airport.

See also 
List of communities in Alberta
List of towns in Alberta
Rundle's Mission

References

External links 

1949 establishments in Alberta
Edmonton Metropolitan Region
Leduc County
Towns in Alberta